Otmar Bernhard (born October 6, 1946 in Munich) is a German politician, representative of the Christian Social Union of Bavaria. He is a member of the Bavarian Landtag. From 2005 to 2007 he was Secretary of Health and from 2007 to 2008 was Bavarian State Minister for the Environment.

See also
List of Bavarian Christian Social Union politicians
 http://www.otmar-bernhard.de

References

Ministers of the Bavaria State Government
Christian Social Union in Bavaria politicians
1946 births
Living people
Politicians from Munich